The Gaula is a river that flows through the Gauldal valley in Trøndelag county, Norway. The river begins in Holtålen municipality near the mountain Kjølifjellet. It then flows through the municipalities of Holtålen, Midtre Gauldal, and Melhus before emptying into Trondheimsfjord near Leinstrand on the border between the municipalities of Trondheim and Melhus.

On its way, it is joined by one large tributary, the Sokna, at the village of Støren in Midtre Gauldal. Other smaller tributaries include the Rugla, Hesja, Holda, Forda, and Bua.

Within the Gaula River, there are two well known waterfalls called Gaulfoss close to the village of Hovin and the Eggafoss near the village of Haltdalen.

In 2005, the Gaula was named the best salmon fishing river in Norway with a catch of  that year. The Gaula is consistently listed among the top 5 salmon fishing rivers in Norway.

References

External links
NFC Fishing on the Gaula
Gaula Naturecenter 

Rivers of Trøndelag
Holtålen
Midtre Gauldal
Melhus
Rivers of Norway